SS James Iredell (MC contract 867) was a Liberty ship in World War II that was attacked in Naples and scuttled on June 8, 1944 to protect Omaha Beach.

History
SS James Iredell had its keel laid down on 25 October 1942 by the North Carolina Shipbuilding Company of Wilmington, North Carolina. She was launched on 29 November 1942. She suffered minor damage while in a convoy in 1943. 

She was quickly repaired, and bombed in Naples on 23 October 1943, with three direct hits. The gasoline the ship was transporting caught on fire and the ship was abandoned. The fire burned for 64 hours, but there were no casualties among the 44-man merchant crew, the 28-man United States Navy contingent, or the 28 passengers.

She was repaired, and was sunk as a blockship off Omaha Beach on 8 June 1944.

References

World War II auxiliary ships of the United States
Liberty ships
Ships built in Wilmington, North Carolina
1943 ships
Maritime incidents in October 1943
Maritime incidents in June 1944
Ships sunk as breakwaters